Sep or SEP may refer to:

Abbreviations
 September
 Septentrional (borrowed from Latin meaning northern, or pertaining to the north)

Military
 , a Polish Navy submarine until 1972
 , a Polish Navy submarine
 Splitterskyddad EnhetsPlattform, a Swedish armoured fighting vehicle

People
 Sep (given name)
 Hrvoje Sep (born 1986), Croatian boxer

Politics and government
 Secretariat of Public Education (Mexico) (Secretaría de Educación Pública)
 Specialna Enota Policije, a Slovenian National Police unit 
 SEP law, Chile
 Socialist Equality Party (disambiguation), various Trotskyist political parties
 Samajik Ekta Party, Haryana, India

Science and technology
 Polyestriol phosphate, an estrogen medication
 Signaling End Point, in telecommunications switching
 Solar Electric Propulsion, of a spacecraft
 Solar energetic particles
 Somatosensory evoked potential, brain activity from touch
 Stanford Exploration Project, for seismic imaging of the Earth
 Standard electrode potential
 IS-1 Sęp, a 1947 Polish  glider
 Somatic Experiencing Practitioner, a title used in a form of alternative psychotherapy

Other uses
 Stanford Encyclopedia of Philosophy
 SEP-IRA, a US pension
 Sęp, Świętokrzyskie Voivodeship, a village in Poland
 Somebody else's problem
 Standard-essential patent, for an invention needed to meet a standard
 Syringe exchange program or needle exchange
 Summer Enrichment Program (University of Colorado), for gifted children
 Society for European Philosophy, an academic society for the study of Continental philosophy

See also
 Seppe (disambiguation)
 Sepp (disambiguation)
 Sept (disambiguation)
 Cep (disambiguation)